In enzymology, a monoterpenol O-acetyltransferase is an enzyme that catalyzes the chemical reaction

acetyl-CoA + a monoterpenol  CoA + a monoterpenol acetate ester

Thus, the two substrates of this enzyme are acetyl-CoA and monoterpenol, whereas its two products are CoA and monoterpenol acetate ester.

This enzyme belongs to the family of transferases, specifically those acyltransferases transferring groups other than aminoacyl groups.  The systematic name of this enzyme class is acetyl-CoA:monoterpenol O-acetyltransferase. This enzyme is also called menthol transacetylase.

References 

 
 

EC 2.3.1
Enzymes of unknown structure